Sean Lambly (born 7 October 1970) is a New Zealand cricketer. He played in four first-class and nine List A matches for Northern Districts from 1993 to 1995.

See also
 List of Northern Districts representative cricketers

References

External links
 

1970 births
Living people
New Zealand cricketers
Northern Districts cricketers
Cricketers from Auckland